This is a list of notable alumni in the Clarion West Writers Workshop, a six-week workshop for writers of science fiction, fantasy, and speculative literature, held annually in Seattle, Washington.

See also
 List of Clarion West Writers Workshop instructors
 Clarion Workshop
 Clarion West Writers Workshop
 List of Clarion Writers Workshop alumni

External links

 Clarion West List of Alumni and Instructors

References

Clarion West Writers Workshop alumni
Creative writing programs
Science fiction organizations
Clarion West Writers Workshop alumni
Clarion West Writers Workshop alumni